The Venezuela national futsal team represents Venezuela in international futsal competitions, such as the World Cup and the Copa América. It is controlled by the Federación Venezolana de Fútbol.

Results and fixtures

The following is a list of match results in the last 12 months, as well as any future matches that have been scheduled.
Legend

2021

Players

Current squad
The following 16 players were called up for 2021 FIFA Futsal World Cup

Competitive record

FIFA Futsal World Cup

Copa América de Futsal
1992 – Did not enter
1995 – Did not enter
1996 – 1st round
1997 – Did not enter
1998 – Did not enter
1999 – Did not enter
2000 – 1st round
2003 – 7th place
2008 – 9th place
2011 – 7th place
2015 – 7th place
2017 – 6th place
2022 – 6th place

FIFA Futsal World Cup qualification (CONMEBOL)/CONMEBOL Preliminary Competition
2012 – 8th place
2016 – 5th place
2021 – 4th place

FIFUSA/AMF Futsal World Cup
1982 - Did not enter
1985 - Did not enter
1988 - Did not enter
1991 - 2nd round
1994 - Quarterfinals
1997 -  Champions
2000 - Did not enter
2003 - Did not enter
2007 - 1st round
2011 - Quarterfinals
2015 - 1st round
2019 - TBD

Grand Prix de Futsal
2005 – 6th place
2006 – Did not enter
2007 – Did not enter
2008 – 9th place
2009 – 9th place
2010 – Did not enter
2011 – Did not enter
2013 – Did not enter
2014 – Did not enter
2015 – Did not enter
2017 – TBD

Honours
FIFUSA/AMF Futsal World Cup
Winners (1): 1997  Champions

References

External links
 Federacion Venezolana De Fútbol The Venezuelan Football Federation official website

Venezuela
Futsal
Futsal in Venezuela